Tuch or tuches may refer to:

 Tuch, a Yiddish term for the human buttocks.
 Alex Daniel Tuch (born 1996), American professional ice hockey forward
 Johann Christian Friedrich Tuch (1806–1867), German Orientalist and theologian
 Walter Tuch (1913–1969), American cinematographer
 Das Indische Tuch, a 1963 West German crime film directed by Alfred Vohrer
 Professor Tuch, pseudonym of Bruno Zach (1891–1945), Ukrainian-born Austrian art deco sculptor
 Jane Tilden (1910–2002), born Marianne Tuch, Austrian actress

See also
 Les Tuche (disambiguation)
 Bum (disambiguation)